Begin Again is a compilation album by American singer-songwriter Norah Jones, released through Blue Note Records on April 12, 2019. The collection is a compilation of singles Jones recorded from 2018 to 2019, and includes collaborations with Jeff Tweedy and Thomas Bartlett. Jones planned to tour Australia and the US in support of the album, before the COVID-19 pandemic.

Background and recording
Jones said of the album that she wanted to record different things, in particular songs that were "quick and fun and easy and low-pressure", including collaborations with musicians that took no more than three days in the studio. She did not want to plan ahead aside from voice memo ideas, but to "create in the moment".

Critical reception

Begin Again has a score of 70 out of 100 from Metacritic based on 5 reviews. On the music blog Idolator Mike Wass calls the musicians involved in the album and the final outcome "eclectic", concluding that "the resulting songs are some of the most inventive of her career." Gabriel Fine wrote in his album review for Consequence of Sound that "there is something thrillingly free about the songs on Begin Again. They resist simple categorization and are experimental in the sense that they embody an unabashed confluence of Jones’ many musical inspirations", and sees that "much of the propulsion on the record comes from Jones’ personnel, who she manages to brilliantly highlight without losing her creative reigns."

Track listing

Personnel
Norah Jones - vocals, piano (tracks 2-7), acoustic guitar and celesta (4), Rhodes electric piano and drums (5), electric organ (7)
Thomas Bartlett - keyboards, piano and OP-1 synthesizer (1, 5), drum programming (5)
Jeff Tweedy - electric guitar (4, 6), acoustic guitar (4), electric bass (6)
Pete Remm - Hammond B3 organ (2, 3)
Christopher Thomas - bass (2, 3, 7)
Brian Blade - drums (2, 3, 7)
Leon Michels - tenor saxophone (3, 7)
Dave Guy - trumpet (3, 7)
Spencer Tweedy - drums (6)

Technical
Thomas Bartlett - recording (1, 5)
Patrick Dillett - recording (2, 3, 7), mixing (1, 5, 7)
Andy Taub and Jens Jungkurth - recording (3)
James Yost - recording assistant (2, 3, 7)
Genevieve Nelson - recording assistant (3)
Tom Schick - recording and mixing (4, 6)
Mark Greenberg - recording assistant (4, 6)
Homer Steinweiss - recording of horns (7)
Tom Elmhirst - mixing (2, 3)
Brandon Bost - mixing engineer (2, 3)
Chris Gehringer - mastering
Will Quinnell - mastering assistant
Frank Harkins - art direction, design
Clay Patrick McBride - photography

Charts

References

2019 albums
Blue Note Records albums
Norah Jones albums